The Hanoi–Lao Cai Expressway is an  expressway in Vietnam, connecting Noi Bai near Hanoi with the northwest border town of Lào Cai, towards Kunming in China. The expressway has major importance in facilitating trade between Vietnam and China and in developing northwest Vietnam. It connects to G8011 Kaiyuan–Hekou Expressway on the Chinese side of the border.

The expressway shortened the travel time between Hanoi to Lao Cai by 3.5 hours, a 50% reduction in travel time. The four-lane section has a maximum speed of 100 km/h, while the two-lane sections are limited to 80 km/h.

Construction 
Construction on the expressway began in 2009 with a total investment of US$1.46 billion.  The Asian Development Bank provided a US$1 billion loan for development of the expressway. South Korean Posco Group won 3 of the 8 bids, China's Guangxi Road & Bridge Engineering w 2 bids on and Vietnamese Vinacomex won one.

When it opened on 21 September 2014, it was the longest expressway in Vietnam. The Yên Bái to Lao Cai section of the route was opened as a two-lane expressway, the section between Yen Bai and Hanoi being a four lane dual carriageway.

See also 

 Hanoi–Lào Cai railway

References 

Expressways in Vietnam